Bindax is a genus of jumping spiders that was first described by Tamerlan Thorell in 1892.  it contains only two species, found only on the Solomon Islands and Sulawesi: B. chalcocephalus and B. oscitans. The name is derived from Βίνδαξ, according to Thorell, a masculine name.

References

Salticidae
Salticidae genera
Spiders of Asia
Taxa named by Tamerlan Thorell